Karim El-Mahouab (born 18 October 1966) is an Algerian handball player. He competed at the 1996 Summer Olympics where he finished in tenth place. He was also the flag bearer for his nation during the opening ceremony.

References 

Algerian male handball players
1966 births
Handball players at the 1996 Summer Olympics
Olympic handball players of Algeria
Living people
21st-century Algerian people